Roger Allen Burkman (born May 22, 1958) is a retired American basketball player and athletic director at Spalding University in Louisville, Kentucky.  Born in Indianapolis, Indiana, he played high school basketball at Franklin Central High School. He played collegiately for the University of Louisville, and was a member of the school's 1980 national championship team. Burkman was selected by the Chicago Bulls in the 6th round (130th pick overall) of the 1981 NBA Draft. He played for the Bulls (1981–82) in the NBA for 6 games. Burkman played for the Anchorage Northern Knights of the Continental Basketball Association during the 1981–81 season.

He was inducted in the Indiana Basketball Hall of Fame. 

He is married to Jefferson County Circuit Judge Judith McDonald-Burkman.

Career statistics

NBA

Regular season

|-
| align="left" | 1981–82
| align="left" | Chicago
| 6 || 0 || 5.0 || .000 || .000 || .833 || 1.0 || .8 || 1.0 || .4 || .8

References

External links

 Indiana Basketball Hall of Fame: Roger Burkman

1958 births
Living people
American men's basketball players
Anchorage Northern Knights players
Basketball players from Indianapolis
Chicago Bulls draft picks
Chicago Bulls players
Guards (basketball)
Louisville Cardinals men's basketball players
Spalding University faculty